Sándor Erdős (born 21 August 1947 in Budapest) is a Hungarian épée fencer.

Olympics 
Erdős won a gold medal in the team épée at the 1972 Summer Olympics in Munich.

At the 1976 Summer Olympics he came in 4th in the team épée, and tied for 7th in the team foil.

See also
 Erdős
 List of select Jewish fencers

References

External links 
 
 
 

1947 births
Living people
Hungarian male épée fencers
Olympic fencers of Hungary
Fencers at the 1972 Summer Olympics
Fencers at the 1976 Summer Olympics
Olympic gold medalists for Hungary
Olympic medalists in fencing
Medalists at the 1972 Summer Olympics
Hungarian male foil fencers
Fencers from Budapest
20th-century Hungarian people
21st-century Hungarian people